Marlon Muraguti Yared (born 27 July 1977) is a Brazilian male volleyball player. He was part of the Brazil men's national volleyball team at the 2010 FIVB Volleyball Men's World Championship in Italy. He played for RJX.

Sporting achievements

Individual
 2010 Memorial of Hubert Jerzy Wagner – Best Setter

References

External links
 Marlon Muraguti Yared at the International Volleyball Federation
 
 Marlon Muraguti Yared at WorldofVolley

1977 births
Living people
Brazilian men's volleyball players
Place of birth missing (living people)
Setters (volleyball)